Udaharanam Sujatha is a 2017 Indian Malayalam-language drama film directed by debutant director "Phantom" Praveen, adapted by Naveen Bhaskar and produced by Martin Prakkat and Joju George. It is a remake of the 2016 Hindi-language film Nil Battey Sannata (The New Classmate).

The film stars Manju Warrier as a single mother living in an impoverished colony in Thiruvananthapuram (Kerala) doing menial jobs to support her young daughter's education. The cast also includes Anaswara Rajan, Nedumudi Venu, Mamta Mohandas and Joju George. Principal photography began on 4 May 2017 and was completed exclusively in Thiruvananthapuram. Madhu Neelakandan handles cinematography. Gopi Sunder is the music director. The film has seven songs, including one promo song sung by V. Suresh Thampanoor.

"Not everyone would be proud of their kids following their footsteps, especially parents belonging to the lower-middle class section of the society. They dream big, so that at least their kids don’t end up struggling, doing low-paying jobs like them. The film portrays this fact well, through the performances of its lead actors, Manju Warrier and Anaswara Rajan.", the Times of India wrote in their review.

The film released along with Dileep starrer Ramaleela in India on 28 September 2017 and was a "hit" in box office. It received positive reviews from critics and audiences alike and won a large number of accolades.

Plot 
Sujatha Krishnan (Manju Warrier) is a high-school drop-out, a young widow and a single mother in living in the city of Thiruvananthapuram. She lives to see her daughter Athira 's (Anaswara Rajan) academic success, taking up more and more trivial jobs at apartments and factories to support her schooling (and the planned expensive "private coaching" for SSLC). Her daughter, though, is far from grateful. She is unmotivated, never studies properly, gets low marks in her school exams and won't quit believing that she can't be anything more than a petty "domestic help" like her mother.

Sujatha narrates her dilemma to her rich employer George Paul (Nedumudi Venu). A kind and open-hearted man, he tells Sujatha about an uncanny solution to her daughter's poor academic performance. Under the new plan, Sujatha will enrol in her daughter's school so that she can learn math and tutor Athira herself. This embarrasses young Athira. Sujatha slowly starts impressing her classmates and scores pretty much well in maths exams. No one, except for the school's kind principal, is aware of Sujatha's relationship to Athira. Athira begs her mother to stop attending the school. She is angered by her mother's success in math, as she herself continues to fail to understand it. Both of them starts a rivalry where if Athira scores more marks than Sujatha the latter should leave school. Athira, seeing no other solution but to score better than her mother, starts studying well. She scores a "personal" record 58% marks in her next mathematics exam. Sujatha is happy, and leaves school.

Sujatha, being naïve, decides to meet the District Collector (Mamta Mohandas) to plan her daughters academic future. She somehow manages get into collector's residence and tells the Collector about her dream to see Athira as a District Collector. The Collector - much to the surprise of Sujatha - tells her that she herself came from a very low income family and couldn't afford to go to expensive private "coaching classes" for Civil Service Exams.

Sujatha soon discovers that her daughter only scored good marks in the last series of exams because she didn't want to attend classes with her mother. Determined to change her daughter Sujatha again starts attending the school. Sujatha now starts taking more and more jobs, works late into the night in small restaurants, and saves more and more money for Athira (and to pay out her family debts). One day Sujatha finds out that Athira has stolen her savings to buy expensive school bags, slippers and dress. Sujatha gets humiliated by the landlady to whom she owes money. Athira suspects that her mother is earning money by prostitution. The relation between the mother and daughter reaches an all-time low.

While going to work Sujatha meets with a road accident and is severely wounded. In the hospital, Athira gets to know that her mother is not doing any prostitution but she is working day and night in a small restaurant in the city. Athira visits her mother in the hospital and asks for forgiveness and vows to "study hard from now on".

Reformed Athira passes 10th class exams (SSLC) with good marks, along with Sujatha, and she eventually fulfils her mother's dream by becoming a District Collector. After being asked what inspired her to apply for the Administrative Service, she answers that she is inspired by her mother, who now tutors economically backward students for free.

Cast
 Manju Warrier as Sujatha Krishnan 
 Anaswara Rajan as Athira Krishnan, Sujatha Krishnan's Daughter 
Aditi Ravi as Athira Krishnan (Adult)
 Mamta Mohandas as Deepa.M District Collector (Thiruvanathpuram)
 Nedumudi Venu as George Paul, Malayalam Script Writer
 Joju George as Headmaster Sreekumar "Kuthira"
Abhija Sivakala as Thulasi
Sudhi Koppa as Jayan
 V. Suresh Thampanoor as Auto Driver
 Alencier Ley Lopez as P.C. Cheriyan
Swaraj Gramika as Rajeev
Jikku Chacko as Malayalam Teacher

Critical reception 
The film released in Kerala to positive reviews from the critics. Ashwiny Iyer Tiwari, director of Nil Battey Sannata, the original 2015 film on which Udaharanam Sujatha was based, tweeted that she loved the film and praised the songs.

Malayalam Manorama describes,  "Manju Warrier and Anaswara Ranjan together have captured the authenticity of the characters with the story-line's intensity, the warmth of mother-daughter love that culminates is the grand catharsis. Nedumudi Venu as scriptwriter George Paul and Joju George as school headmaster with de-glam avatars do justice to their roles by getting into the skin of the character as the story progresses. [Phantom] Praveen have pitched the characters on the right spot with moderation throughout the story."

Times of India noted the film to be "an interesting story, good performances, music and subtle humour, all of which merit your time in the theatre."

Awards and nominations 

Kerala Film Critics Association Awards
 Best Actress - Manju Warrier

Asiavision Awards 2017 
 Best Actress - Manju Warrier (shared with C/O Saira Banu)
 Best Singer (female) - Sithara Krishnakumar - Ethu Mazhayilu

Yuva Awards 2017
Outstanding Personality - Manju Warrier
Asianet Film Awards 2018
Special Jury Award- Joju George

North American Film Awards 2018
 Best Socially Committed Movie - Phantom Praveen
 Best Actress (Popular) - Manju Warrier
 Best Music Director - Gopi Sunder (shared with Take Off)
 Best Singer (Female) - Sithara Krishnakumar
 Best Cinematographer - Madhu Neelakandan (shared with Ramante Edanthottam)
 Best Child Artist - Anaswara Rajan

Vanitha Film Awards 2018
 Popular Movie - Phantom Praveen, Martin Prakkat, Joju George
 Best Actress- Manju Warrier
Asianet Comedy Awards 
Best Actress - Manju Warrier (also for her performance in C/O Saira Banu) - Nominated

65th Filmfare Awards South

 Filmfare Critics Award for Best Actress- Manju Warrier 
 Nominated - Filmfare Award for Best Actress - Malayalam  - Manju Warrier

References

External links
 

2017 films
Malayalam remakes of Hindi films
Films scored by Gopi Sundar
2010s children's drama films
Films about the education system in India
Films shot in Thiruvananthapuram
Indian children's drama films
2017 directorial debut films
2010s Malayalam-language films